Anthia aequilatera is a species of ground beetle in the subfamily Anthiinae found in South Africa. It was described by Johann Christoph Friedrich Klug in 1853.

References

Anthiinae (beetle)
Beetles described in 1853